Street Sense may refer to:

 Street Sense (horse), a Thoroughbred race horse, winner of the 2007 Kentucky Derby
 Street Sense (newspaper), a Washington, D.C.-based street newspaper